Williamstown Dockyard was one of Australia's principal ship building yards at Williamstown, Victoria, Australia.

The Colony of Victoria decided to construct a large slipway at Williamstown to provide ship repair facilities in 1856 and the Government Patent Slip was opened in 1858. Slip Pier was built in 1858 and was used in conjunction with the Government Patent Slip. The Slip Pier was later known as the Lady Loch Jetty after the similarly named Government steamer. The pier and Government Patent Slipway were demolished in 1919.

In 1858, the Colony of Victoria decided to build a graving dock and dockyard. Construction commenced in 1868, and was completed in February 1874. The Alfred Graving Dock, named after Alfred, Duke of Edinburgh, was built at a cost of £300,000. The dock was designed by William Wardell for the Public Works Department (Victoria), and it was the largest structure of its type in the southern hemisphere.

The Dockyard Pier, originally known as Dock Pier was constructed in 1874 for use with vessels engaged in pre/post docking in the Alfred Graving Dock. In the 1870s, the railway department contracted for the construction of a new pier to meet increased demand imposed by wool and later grain handling. When completed in 1878, it was initially referred to as the Western Pier, but was later renamed New Railway Pier. It was rebuilt in 1915 and 1927 and was renamed Nelson Pier in 1923. The pier and surrounding land was purchased by the Commonwealth in 1967, and use of the facility declined. Demolition work began in 1979 due to its poor condition. Nelsons Pier West was constructed in 1978 to replace the nearby Nelson Pier. It provided two cranes and two berths for the refitting and outfitting of warships. Reid St Pier was constructed for the Melbourne Harbour Trust for exclusive use with its own floating plant in September 1891. It was later used to house the tug fleet, and was rebuilt in 1949.

In 1913, the dockyard was known as the State Shipbuilding Yard and was requisitioned in 1918 by the Commonwealth. Ownership passed to the Melbourne Harbor Trust in 1924 and during World War II it was requisitioned by the Commonwealth in 1942 and was known as HM Naval Dockyard Williamstown, or Williamstown Naval Dockyard. In 1987 it passed into private control of Tenix Defence and which was subsequently acquired by BAE Systems Australia.

Vessels constructed at Williamstown Dockyard

References 

 Victorian Heritage Register Accessed on 9 Nov 2010
 National Trust of Australia (Victoria) Register Accessed on 9 Nov 2010

External links
 Alfred Graving Dock

Shipyards of Australia
Shipbuilding companies of Australia
Heritage-listed buildings in Melbourne
Transport buildings and structures in Victoria (Australia)
Williamstown, Victoria
1874 establishments in Australia
Buildings and structures completed in 1874
Buildings and structures in the City of Hobsons Bay